Paula Ormaechea (born 28 September 1992) is an Argentine tennis player based in Italy. She has won 16 singles and nine doubles titles on the ITF Circuit. On 21 October 2013, she reached a career-high singles ranking of world No. 59.

Ormaechea has a 21–13 win–loss record, playing for Argentina Fed Cup team. She plays in the Italian Tennis Serie A1 (major circuit) in the Tennis Club Rungg of Eppan an der Weinstraße.

Personal life
Paula Ormaechea was born 1992 to Mirna and Marcelo Ormaechea. She has two sisters, Valentina and Sofía. Juan Pablo Guzmán, former ATP tennis player, serves as her coach. Ormaechea cites Roger Federer, Serena and Venus Williams as her role models, and also admires Andre Agassi and Pete Sampras.

Career review

Junior career
Ormaechea entered professional junior tournaments in 2006. She defeated Kristina Mladenovic in the semifinals of the Banana Bowl, but lost to Ana Bogdan in the finals 6–2 6–4. Ormaechea won her next title at Uruguay Bowl in March 2009. She also played at the 2009 French Open and US Open, but fell to Bianca Botto and Richèl Hogenkamp in the first round, respectively. She also won four doubles events, her last junior doubles title came at Canadian Open championship in September 2009.

Fed Cup
Ormaechea made her debut for Argentina Fed Cup team on 26 April 2009 in the 2009 World Group Playoff against Ukraine. She partnered María Irigoyen, losing to Mariya Koryttseva and Olga Savchuk in straight sets. Ormaechea made her singles debut in 2010 World Group II rubber against Estonia. She lost her first match to world No. 61, Kaia Kanepi, and the second one to Maret Ani. Ormaechea also played in the rubber against Canada, and lost both of her singles matches — against Aleksandra Wozniak and Valérie Tétreault.

2011
Her first tournament was an ITF event in Colombia, where she lost to Alexandra Cadanțu 4–6, 0–6 in the first round of qualifying. After this, she played the Copa Colsanitas, but again lost in qualifying, this time in the second round. Despite her bad run, Paula rebounded and won an ITF tournament in Santiago, Chile one month later. She then played four ITF events during May, reaching the final of one, but losing to top seed Lucie Hradecká 6–4, 3–6, 2–6.

Paula then played the qualifying for the Brussels Open, her first Premier tournament. She got to the final round of qualifying after defeating Catalina Castaño and Andrea Hlaváčková, but was then swept aside by doubles specialist Abigail Spears, 6–1, 6–1.

Following this loss, she headed to Rome to play a $25k tournament, but lost in the second round to Sofia Shapatava. Then, following another loss in the quarterfinals of an ITF event in Poland and an early elimination in the qualifying at the Budapest Grand Prix, Paula's form improved when she qualified for the Gastein Ladies in Kitzbühel, Austria. She there lost in the first round of the main draw to María José Martínez Sánchez, in straight sets.

Paula then took a break from the WTA Tour, playing eight ITF tournaments from August to October, winning two of them.

2012
Ormaechea began new season at the Sydney International where she lost in the second round of qualifying to 13th seed Vania King. Following this loss, she headed to Melbourne for the Australian Open where she qualified for her first Grand Slam main draw beating seventh seed CoCo Vandeweghe, Hsieh Su-wei, and 19th seed Yvonne Meusburger. In the first round of the main draw, she overcame Simona Halep in three sets. In the second round, however, she was sent crashing out by eighth seed Agnieszka Radwańska, in straight sets. Due to her strong beginning of the new season, her ranking peaked at over No. 140 for the first time.

Performance timelines
Only main-draw results in WTA Tour, Grand Slam tournaments, Fed Cup/Billie Jean King Cup and Olympic Games are included in win–loss records.

Singles
Current after the 2023 Australian Open.

Doubles

WTA career finals

Singles: 1 (runner-up)

WTA Challenger finals

Singles: 1 (1 runner-up)

ITF Circuit finals

Singles: 32 (16 titles, 16 runner–ups)

Doubles: 24 (9 titles, 15 runner–ups)

National representation

Fed Cup/Billie Jean King Cup performances

Singles (12–10)

Doubles (0–2)

Notes

References

External links

 
 
 

1992 births
Living people
People from Castellanos Department
Tennis players from Buenos Aires
Argentine female tennis players
Argentine people of Basque descent
Tennis players at the 2015 Pan American Games
Pan American Games bronze medalists for Argentina
Pan American Games medalists in tennis
Competitors at the 2010 South American Games
South American Games medalists in tennis
South American Games bronze medalists for Argentina
Medalists at the 2015 Pan American Games